The 1925 All-Missouri Valley Conference football team consists of American football players chosen by various organizations for All-Missouri Valley Conference teams for the 1925 college football season.  The selectors for the 1925 season included the Associated Press (AP).

All-Missouri Valley selections

Ends
 Carl Bacchus, Missouri (AP-1)
 Ted Sloane, Drake (AP-1)

Tackles
 Ed Weir, Nebraska (AP-1)
 Ed Lindenmeyer, Missouri (AP-1)

Guards
 Ed Brockman, Oklahoma (AP-1)
 Harry McGee, Kansas State (AP-1)

Centers
 Harold Hutchison, Nebraska (AP-1)

Quarterbacks
 Johnny Behm, Iowa State (AP-1)

Halfbacks
 Sam Whiteman, Missouri (AP-1)
 Glen Spear, Drake (AP-1)

Fullbacks
 John R. Rhodes, Nebraska (AP-1)

Key
AP = Associated Press

See also
 1925 College Football All-America Team

References

All-Missouri Valley Conference football team
All-Big Eight Conference football teams